Gootee Nunatak is a small but distinctive nunatak, about  high, which is the only rock outcrop at the west end of Couzens Bay, Shackleton Coast, Antarctica. The nunatak was geologically mapped by a United States Antarctic Program field party led by Edmund Stump, 2000–01, and named after geologist Brian Gootee, a member of the party.

References

Nunataks of Oates Land